Hylarana nicobariensis is an amphibian of the genus Hylarana, which can be found in lowland secondary forests or disturbed areas such as swamps.  The species is known from Nicobar Islands (the type locality), Thailand, Peninsular Malaysia, Sumatra, Java, Bali, Borneo and Palawan.

References

nicobariensis
Amphibians described in 1870